Ermes Muccinelli (28 July 1927 – 4 November 1994) was an Italian footballer who played as a forward, mainly as a winger.

Club career
Muccinelli was born in Lugo di Romagna, in the  province of Ravenna. During his career he played for Juventus F.C. (1946–1957 and 1959) and S.S. Lazio (1957–1958), winning two Scudettos (1950, 1952) and one Coppa Italia (1958).

International career
Muccinelli also played 15 matches and scored 4 goals for the Italian national team between 1950 and 1957, and took part in two World Cups (1950 and 1954).

Death
Muccinelli died in Savona in 1994.

References

External links
 Profile at enciclopediadelcalcio.it 

1927 births
1994 deaths
Sportspeople from the Province of Ravenna
Italian footballers
Italy international footballers
1950 FIFA World Cup players
1954 FIFA World Cup players
Juventus F.C. players
S.S. Lazio players
Como 1907 players
Serie A players
Serie B players
Association football forwards
Association football wingers
A.S.D. La Biellese players
Footballers from Emilia-Romagna